Hemileuca hualapai, the hualapai buckmoth, is a species of insect in the family Saturniidae. It is found in Central America and North America.

The MONA or Hodges number for Hemileuca hualapai is 7728.

References

Further reading

 
 
 

Hemileucinae
Articles created by Qbugbot
Moths described in 1883